Borradaile Island is one of the Balleny Islands. It was the site of the first landing south of the Antarctic Circle, and features the "remarkable pinnacle" called Beale Pinnacle, near Cape Beale on its south-eastern coast, and Cape Scoresby on its north-western coast.

Exploration
Borradaile Island was discovered in February 1839 by John Balleny, who named it for W. Borradaile, one of the merchants who united with Charles Enderby in sending out the expedition. The first landing on the island was by Captain Freeman of the cutter Sabrina on February 12, 1839, who landed briefly on a spit at the islands north-west corner. This was the first time a human set foot south of the Antarctic Circle.

Features
Cape Scoresby is a high bluff marking the north end of Borradaile Island. It was charted by personnel on the RRS Discovery II who made running surveys of the northern portion of the Balleny Islands in 1936–1938. Cape Scoresby is named after the RSS William Scoresby, a companion research ship of Discovery II in carrying out oceanographic work in Antarctic waters at that time, which is in turn named after the Arctic explorer William Scoresby. Beale Pinnacle is a boot-shaped rock pinnacle, 60 m high, lying close off Cape Beale, a steep bluff on the south-east side of the island. Both are named after W. Beale, another of the merchants who joined with Charles Enderby in sending out the John Balleny expedition of 1839.

See also 
 List of Antarctic and subantarctic islands

References 

Islands of the Balleny Islands